Kokomma is a 2012 Nigerian drama film directed by Tom Robson. It stars Belinda Effah, Ini Ikpe and Ekere Nkanga. It received 3 nominations at the 9th Africa Movie Academy Awards, with Effah winning the award for Most Promising Actor for her comic role in the film. It was released on DVD in September 2012.

Cast
Belinda Effah
Ini Ikpe
Ekere Nkanga
Ifeanyi Kalu

References

External links 
 

Nigerian drama films
Films about child abuse